Malawian cuisine includes the foods and culinary practices of Malawi. Tea and fish are popular features of Malawian cuisine. Sugar, coffee, corn, potatoes, sorghum, cattle and goats are also important components of the cuisine and economy.

Lake Malawi is a source of fish including chambo (similar to bream), usipa (similar to sardine), mpasa (similar to salmon), and kampango.

Nsima is a staple food made from ground corn and served with side dishes of meat, beans and vegetables. It can be eaten for lunch and dinner.

Additional Malawi cuisine includes:
Kachumbari, a type of tomato and onion salad, known locally in Malawi as a sumu or shum or simply 'tomato and onion salad'.
Thobwa, a fermented drink made from white maize and millet or sorghum.
Kondowole, made from cassava flour and water. It is primarily from northern Malawi and is a very sticky meal resembling Malawian nsima, Tanzanian ugali, or Ugandan posho. It is mostly cooked on the floor because of its texture as it is normally tough to run a cooking stick through hence much strength is needed. Kondowole is normally eaten with fish.
 Futali
 Nthochi, banana bread

Fish
Fish in Malawi ranges from utaka, kapenta, kampango, bombe, mlamba, micheni, butter fish (known as batala) and chambo (a famous fish from Lake Malawi) among others.

Kondowole is not a meal that can be made in bulk because of its consistency and texture, therefore is not as frequently eaten as nsima.

See also

Agriculture in Malawi
Malawian food crisis

References

 
East African cuisine